Rock Lake (Manitoba) is the second largest navigable lake in southwestern Manitoba, Canada. The lake is fed by several waterways the main ones being the Pembina River and Badger Creek.

The lake has been a popular recreational area since the turn of the 20th century. The lake area is popular for boating, fishing, a wide variety of water activities, cottagers and home owners. 
 
Pilot Mound is about a 2 hour drive southwest of Winnipeg. The lake is located in the Rural Municipalities of Roblin, and Argyle.

Rock Lake Dam 
A concrete stop log dam was built about a mile east of the lake on the Pembina River in 1940. The dam is used to maintain levels a much as possible above 405.08 metres.

References

External links
Rock Lake Page
Rock Lake Bathymetric map

Lakes of Manitoba